Anthony Lesiotis (born 24 April 2000), is an Australian professional footballer who plays as a defensive midfielder. He previously played for Melbourne Victory, Western Sydney Wanderers and Melbourne City.

Club career
He made his professional debut for Melbourne City on 7 August 2018 in an FFA Cup match against Brisbane Roar.

He signed for crosstown rivals Melbourne Victory on 3 January 2019, becoming the first player to make the switch in that direction.

He debuted for Melbourne Victory against Brisbane Roar on 15 January 2019, coming off the bench as a substitute for Victory captain Carl Valeri.

In September 2020, Lesiotis left Melbourne Victory.

On 5 November 2020, Western Sydney Wanderers announced the signing of Lesiotis on a two-year deal. He was released in April 2021, having not made a single appearance. A couple of weeks later, he returned to Melbourne City, signing a scholarship deal until the end of the 2020–21 A-League season.

Personal life
Lesiotis was born in Australia, and is of Greek descent.

Career statistics

Club

References

External links

2000 births
Living people
Australian soccer players
Australian people of Greek descent
Association football midfielders
Melbourne City FC players
Melbourne Victory FC players
Western Sydney Wanderers FC players
A-League Men players
National Premier Leagues players